Cristian Rivera (born 6 September 1963) is a Dominican Republic former weightlifter. He competed in the men's bantamweight event at the 1988 Summer Olympics.

References

External links
 

1963 births
Living people
Dominican Republic male weightlifters
Olympic weightlifters of the Dominican Republic
Weightlifters at the 1988 Summer Olympics
Central American and Caribbean Games medalists in weightlifting
Place of birth missing (living people)
Medalists at the 1987 Pan American Games
Pan American Games medalists in weightlifting
Pan American Games bronze medalists for the Dominican Republic
Weightlifters at the 1983 Pan American Games
20th-century Dominican Republic people
21st-century Dominican Republic people